Verano de Escándalo (2015) (Spanish for "Summer of Scandal") was a professional wrestling pay-per-view event produced by the Lucha Libre AAA World Wide (AAA) promotion, which took place on June 14, 2015 in "Arena Monterrey" in Monterrey, Nuevo León, Mexico. The event has been a regular summer event for AAA since 1997, only skipping the event in 2012 and 2013, 2015 marked the 17th time AAA has held such an event.

Production

Background
First held during the summer of 1997 the Mexican professional wrestling, company Lucha Libre AAA World Wide (AAA, or Triple A) began holding a major wrestling show during the summer, most often in September, called Verano de Escándalo ("Summer of Scandal"). The Verano de Escándalo show was an annual event from 1997 until 2011, then AAA did not hold a show in 2012 and 2013 before bringing the show back in 2014, but this time in June, putting it at the time AAA previously held their Triplemanía show. In 2012 and 2013 Triplemanía XX and Triplemanía XXI was held in August instead of the early summer. The show often features championship matches or Lucha de Apuestas or bet matches where the competitors risked their wrestling mask or hair on the outcome of the match. In Lucha Libre the Lucha de Apuetas match is considered more prestigious than a championship match and a lot of the major shows feature one or more Apuesta matches. The 2015 Verano de Escándalo show was the 17th show in the series.

Storylines
The Verano de Escándalo show featured six professional wrestling matches with different wrestlers involved in pre-existing, scripted feuds, plots, and storylines. Wrestlers were portrayed as either heels (referred to as rudos in Mexico, those that portray the "bad guys") or faces (técnicos in Mexico, the "good guy" characters) as they followed a series of tension-building events, which culminated in a wrestling match or series of matches.

Results

References

2015 in professional wrestling
Verano de Escándalo
2015 in Mexico